Kimeshek or Elechek is a traditional headgear of married women with children in Kazakhstan, Karakalpakstan and Kyrgyzstan. Kimeshek is also worn by Central Asian Jewish women. Uzbek and Tajik women wear a similar headdress called . Kimeshek is made of white cloth, and the edge is full of patterns. Kimeshek might have different designs and colors based on the wearer's social status, age, and family.

In Karakalpakstan, there are two different types of kimeshek, alike in Kazakhstan, only married women wear kimeshek. A girl preparing for marriage would make the kimeshek herself. As the woman grew older, she would instead wear a white . However, she would keep the red kimeshek. The kimeshek was considered very important; it was taboo to give one away.

Gallery

References

Kazakhstani culture
Kyrgyzstani culture
Marriage
Headgear
Islamic female clothing